Colours is the debut studio album of Danish singer Christopher released on EMI Denmark. Two singles were released from the album prior. They are "Against the Odds" and "Nothing in Common".

Track listing

Charts
The album was released on 23 March 2012 and hit #4 on the Danish Albums Chart in its first week of release.

References

2012 debut albums
Christopher (singer) albums